Gettysburg Area High School is a public high school located in the borough of Gettysburg, Pennsylvania, United States. It serves students from central and southern Adams County, and is the sole high school operated by the Gettysburg Area School District. Gettysburg Area High School is located at 1130 Old Harrisburg Road, Gettysburg, PA 17325. In 2016, enrollment was reported as 1067 pupils in 9th through 12th grades

Extracurriculars
The Gettysburg Area School District offers a variety of clubs and activities, and an extensive sports program. The school offers a JROTC program and a student Technology Association, both of which are award-winning.

Sports
The district funds:
Varsity

Boys
Baseball - AAAAA
Basketball- AAAAA
Cross country - AA
Football - AAAA
Golf - AAA
Soccer - AAA
Swimming and diving - AA
Tennis - AAA
Track and field - AAA
Wrestling - AAA

Girls
Basketball - AAAAA
Cheer - AAAAAA
Cross country - AA
Field hockey - AA
Golf - AAA
Soccer (fall) - AAA
Softball - AAAAA
Swimming and diving - AA
Tennis - AAA
Track and field - AAA
Volleyball - AAA

Notable alumni

 Butch Alberts, Class of 1968. Played baseball and football at the University of Cincinnati. Was a professional baseball player, making it to the major leagues for six games with the Toronto Blue Jays in 1978.
 Steve Courson, Class of 1973. Played college football at the University of South Carolina, before having an eight-year NFL career. Won two Super Bowls with the Pittsburgh Steelers. Only football player in Gettysburg history to have his number retired.
 Eric Rosenbach, Class of 1991. Retired U.S. Army captain who served as Pentagon Chief of Staff from July 2015 to January 2017 and as Assistant Secretary of Defense for Homeland Defense and Global Security from September 2014 to September 2015
 Brandon Streeter, Class of 1995. Started at quarterback for two years at Clemson University. Currently the offensive coordinator and quarterbacks coach at Clemson.

See also
 High schools in Pennsylvania

References

Public high schools in Pennsylvania
Schools in Adams County, Pennsylvania